Hör klockorna med ängsligt dån (Hear the bells with anxious thunder) or Fredman's Song no. 6 is one of the Swedish 18th century poet and performer Carl Michael Bellman's Fredman's Songs, written in 1769. It is subtitled  (About brandy-distiller Lundholm). It was originally one of the texts for Bellman's Order of Bacchus. It was first performed on 15 October 1769, and quickly became popular, spreading as a transcript. It is structured as a funeral oration for a member of Lundholm's Order, parodying the Swedish system of noble Orders.

Context

Song

Music and verse form 

The song was written on 15 October 1769. The melody is based on an ariette from Justine Favart and Adolphe Blaise's 1763 French comic operetta Annette and Lubin. There are four stanzas, each of six lines, three long and then three short. The rhyming scheme is ABA-CCA.

Lyrics 

The song is a lament for brandy-distiller Lundholm, described in rococo terms as a member of the Order of Bacchus. It is subtitled  (About brandy-distiller Lundholm).

Reception

Bellman's English biographer, Paul Britten Austin, states that the song was first performed at Lissander's, late in 1769, at a meeting of the Order of Bacchus. Bellman founded the Order, according to one of the participants, the poet and aristocrat Johan Gabriel Oxenstierna, "in honour of Bacchus. To it he admits no one who in the sight of all hasn't twice lain in the gutter [drunk]". Lundholm was a knight of the Order, a faithful son of Bacchus, god of wine; he saw most of his days "through a bottle's end". Britten Austin calls the words of the song "memorable", writing that 

Carina Burman writes in her biography of Bellman that in the second verse, Bellman mixes styles: the first line's dully-tolling bells would fit in an epitaph poem, whereas the second line's "lull lull" is in the mode of a lullaby; and then the love-god Cupid appears, only to find that Lundholm was a bad lover, so drunk that one could become intoxicated just by kissing his chin. The third verse, she comments, adopts the common trope  in which a life is represented as a day, going from the morning of childhood via the noon of youth to the evening of old age, and transforming it: Lundholm is said seldom to have seen the morning sun, while an evening blush is seen on his red nose. The last verse parodies the Swedish system of noble Orders more directly, Lundholm's knightly insignia being destroyed after his death. Burman notes that the poem was probably part of the performance that so impressed the poet and diplomat Johan Gabriel Oxenstierna when he wrote a famous diary entry of 4 December 1769 about Bellman's performing arts, and that it has since become one of the most popular of Fredman's Songs.

The Bellman biographer Lars Lönnroth sets the poem in the context of Bellman's Order of Bacchus, describing his Order chapter ceremony for the funeral of knight Lundholm as "a real song-cycle in miniature with choirs and soloists for both male and female voices". In Lönnroth's view, it is perhaps the finest of Bellman's Order of Bacchus pieces, and the first to combine burlesque situation comedy with magnificent music. "Hör klockorna" is one of the choral songs, accompanied by the ringing of bells. Lönnroth writes that its description of Lundholm's corpse parodies Favart's text, which amorously described the youthful beauty of the fifteen year old Annette. In place of the shepherdess's kissable mouth and fresh skin, Bellman portrays the aged brandy-distiller's crumbling state, stinking of alcohol. Lönnroth comments that this was the first time that Bellman had managed, as Oxenstierna had observed, to unite the "ridiculous" with the "sublime", parodying both the comic opera of the song's tune and Sweden's noble Orders.

The song has been recorded by the singer and actor Sven-Bertil Taube on his 1959 album Carl Michael Bellman, reissued as part of his 1987 CD Fredmans Epistlar och Sånger, and by Per Chenon on his 1989 album Bellman.

References

Sources 

 
 
 
 
  (contains the most popular Epistles and Songs, in Swedish, with sheet music)
  (with facsimiles of sheet music from first editions in 1790, 1791)

External links 

 Song text at Bellman.net

1769 compositions 
Swedish songs
Fredmans sånger